Lachnophyllum is a genus of Asian flowering plants in the family Asteraceae.

 Species
 Lachnophyllum gossypinum Bunge - Iran, Afghanistan, Turkmenistan, Uzbekistan, Kazakhstan, Kyrgyzstan, Tajikistan
 Lachnophyllum noeanum Boiss. - Turkey, Iran, Palestine

References

Asteraceae genera
Astereae
Taxa named by Alexander von Bunge